James Elisha 'Jim' Folsom Jr. (born May 14, 1949) is an American politician who was the 50th governor of Alabama from April 22, 1993, to January 16, 1995. He has also served as the lieutenant governor of Alabama on two occasions. He is a member of the Democratic Party.

Early life and education

Born in Montgomery, Alabama, he is the son of former First Lady of Alabama Jamelle Folsom and legendary two-term Alabama Governor James E. "Big Jim" Folsom Sr.   Jim Folsom Jr. is therefore known as "Little Jim" even though he is well over six feet tall.  In 1974, he graduated from Jacksonville State University, where he presently serves as a trustee.

Early career

During his first run for a political office, he lost the primary to incumbent Democratic Congressman Tom Bevill by an overwhelming margin. However he was elected to the Alabama Public Service Commission in 1978.

Folsom unlike his father was a moderate-to-conservative Democrat. He won support from groups his father had long opposed, especially a group of conservative business people known as the Big Mules. In 1980, Folsom ran for the U.S. Senate and attacked the incumbent, Donald W. Stewart, as being too liberal for Alabama and called him a "puppet of the great Washington power structure." Although Stewart outspent Folsom $500,000 to $75,000, he very narrowly missed winning a majority in the primary and Folsom won the runoff. In the general election, Folsom lost by a narrow margin to Republican Jeremiah Denton, who was aided by the Ronald Reagan landslide, which helped Republican candidates across the country.

Folsom was re-elected to the Alabama Public Service Commission in 1982.

James Folsom was elected Alabama Lieutenant Governor and served from January 19, 1987, to April 22, 1993 (being re-elected in 1990). During both terms, as a matter of law, Folsom was also President and Presiding Officer of the Alabama State Senate. He served under Governor H. Guy Hunt, the first Republican Alabama Governor since Reconstruction. Hunt and Folsom also happen to be from the same (Cullman) county. Folsom also was a member of the National Association of Lieutenant Governors.

Governorship
In 1993, Hunt was convicted of state ethics law violations regarding the funding of Hunt's second inaugural ceremonies.  Like most states, Alabama's constitution prohibits convicted felons from serving in office. As a result, Hunt was forced to resign on April 22, 1993, and Folsom automatically became governor.

Only weeks after Folsom assumed the office, state officials were approached by Mercedes-Benz about the possibility of locating its first manufacturing plant outside its native Germany in Alabama. Over the following months, Folsom led Alabama's efforts to recruit the facility, culminating in an October 1993 announcement that Alabama had beaten 30 other states for the coveted facility. The prestige of the Mercedes plant opened the door for future automotive plants to locate in the state.

Within six days after taking office Governor Folsom ordered the removal of the Confederate flag from the state capitol to a memorial.  His de facto Chief of Staff was his longtime friend and confidant, Charlie Waldrep, an attorney at Waldrep, Stewart & Kendrick, LLC. Governor Folsom also appointed a number of African Americans and women to his staff.

In 1994, he ran for a full four-year term in his own right. Although some regarded Folsom as a popular governor, three candidates challenged him in the Democratic primary, the most  serious being Paul Hubbert, the executive secretary of the Alabama Education Association and nominee for governor in 1990. Folsom after a fierce and sometimes nasty primary, fended off Hubbert's challenge with 54% of the vote. But Hubbert's primary challenge damaged Folsom, who in the General Election, was narrowly defeated by former Democratic Governor Fob James, who was running as a Republican. Even though 1994 was a tough year for Democrats and that Folsom was facing a popular former governor in James and had spent a lot of money to win his primary against Hubbert, the result was narrow. In fact, Folsom lost by less than 10,000 votes or 49.7%-50.3% to James.

Compared to other prominent Democratic incumbent Governors who lost that year such as Ann Richards in Texas, Bruce King in New Mexico, and Mario Cuomo in New York, Folsom ran much more strongly than they did. He also ran stronger than Democratic nominees in other Southern states with governor's races, such as Phil Bredesen in Tennessee (who eventually was elected there in 2002), Jack Mildren in Oklahoma, and Nick Theodore in South Carolina.

Post-governorship and return to politics

In 2006, Folsom reentered state politics, running again as the Democratic nominee for lieutenant governor. He won the Democratic nomination unopposed, and in the general election, he narrowly defeated Republican lawyer Luther Strange for a third, nonconsecutive four-year term. Folsom is the longest-serving lieutenant governor in Alabama history with 10 years of service; his third term ended on January 17, 2011.

Folsom endorsed former U.S. Senator Bill Bradley of New Jersey in the 2000 Democratic presidential primaries, Governor of Vermont Howard Dean in 2004 Democratic presidential primaries, and U.S. Senator and future President Barack Obama of Illinois in the 2008 Democratic presidential primaries. In 2016, he was a strong supporter of former Governor of Maryland Martin O'Malley for president.

He announced on April 1, 2009, that he would seek re-election as lieutenant governor in 2010 rather than run for the Democratic nomination for governor.  On November 2, 2010, Folsom was defeated by three percentage points in his re-election bid for a fourth term by the Republican nominee, Kay Ivey. Folsom explored a potential 2018 bid for governor.

Folsom is married to the former Marsha Guthrie. They have two children.  He is an Episcopalian.

Electoral history

Democratic primary for the U.S. House of Representatives – AL 4th district, 1976
 Tom Bevill (Inc.) – 90,168 (80.87%)
 Jim Folsom Jr. – 21,335 (19.13%)

Democratic primary for the United States Senate, 1980
 Donald W. Stewart (Inc.) – 222,540 (48.63%)
 Jim Folsom Jr. – 163,196 (35.67%)
 Finis St. John – 51,260 (11.20%)
 Margaret E. Stewart – 20,582 (4.50%)

Democratic runoff for the United States Senate, 1980
 Jim Folsom Jr. – 204,186 (50.60%)
 Donald W. Stewart – 199,365 (49.40%)

United States Senate election in Alabama, 1980
 Jeremiah Denton (R) – 650,363 (50.15%)
 Jim Folsom Jr. (D) – 610,175 (47.05%)

Democratic primary for lieutenant governor, 1986
 Jim Folsom Jr. – 331,527 (37.72%)
 John Teague – 277,899 (31.62%)
 Hinton Mitchem – 203,112 (23.11%)
 Melba Till Allen – 66,439 (7.56%)

Democratic runoff for lieutenant governor, 1986
 Jim Folsom Jr. – 517,724 (57.49%)
 John Teague – 382,836 (42.51

Election for lieutenant governor, 1986
 Jim Folsom Jr. (D) – 726,111 (61.85%)
 Don McGriff (R) – 447,978 (38.16%)

Democratic primary for lieutenant governor, 1990
 Jim Folsom Jr. (Inc.) – 510,814 (80.87%)
 William McKinley Branch – 120,861 (19.13%)

Election for lieutenant governor, 1990
 Jim Folsom Jr. (D) (Inc.) – 768,988 (67.33%)
 Bob McKee (R) – 373,072 (32.67%)

Democratic primary for governor, 1994
 Jim Folsom Jr. (Inc.) – 380,227 (54.04%)
 Paul R. Hubbert – 285,554 (40.59%)
 Margaret E. Stewart – 24,254 (3.45%)
 Tom Hayden – 13,532 (1.92%)

Alabama gubernatorial election, 1994
 Fob James (R) – 604,926 (50.33%)
 Jim Folsom Jr. (D) (Inc.) – 594,169 (49.43%)

Democratic primary for lieutenant governor, 2006
 Jim Folsom Jr. – unopposed

Election for lieutenant governor, 2006
 Jim Folsom Jr. (D) – 629,268 (50.61%)
 Luther Strange (R) – 610,982 (49.14%)
 Write-in candidates – 3,029 (0.24%)

Election for lieutenant governor, 2010
 Kay Ivey (R) – 764,112 (51.47%)
 Jim Folsom Jr. (D) – 718,636 (48.40%)
 Write-in candidates – 1,945 (0.13%)

References

External links

Office of the Lt. Governor official government site
 Jim Folsom for Lt. Governor official campaign site
Appearances on C-SPAN programs
Alabama Governor James Elisha Folsom Jr.  government profile
Profile at the Encyclopedia of Alabama
Biography at the Alabama Senate
Alabama Democratic Party 

|-

|-

|-

|-

|-

|-

|-

|-

1949 births
Episcopalians from Alabama
Democratic Party governors of Alabama
Folsom family of Alabama
Governors of Alabama
Lieutenant Governors of Alabama
Living people
People from Cullman, Alabama
Politicians from Montgomery, Alabama